Ellabella bayensis is a moth in the Copromorphidae family. It is found in California.

The length of the forewings is 8.2–11 mm for males and 8.8-10.8 mm for females. The forewings are brown, irrorated with brown and tan scales. The hindwings are pale grey-tan. Adults are on wing from January to March.

The larvae feed on the foliage of Mahonia pinnata. They feed from within silk-tied shelters.

References

Natural History Museum Lepidoptera generic names catalog

Copromorphidae
Moths described in 1984